The Port Colborne Recreationists were a junior ice hockey team in the Ontario Hockey Association, based in Port Colborne, Ontario. The Recreationists played at the Junior B level through the 1940s, with the exception of one season.

Port Colborne won the 1943 Junior B championship known as the Sutherland Cup, defeating the Milton Bombers two games to none.  After winning the Junior B title, Port Colborne was promoted to the Junior A level, which was in need of teams. The Recreationists completed one full season and then folded early in their second.  It is possible that they returned to Junior B from this point on.

Yearly Results

See also
Port Colborne Sailors

Defunct Ontario Hockey League teams
Port Colborne